Events from the year 1754 in Denmark.

Incumbents
 Monarch – Frederick V
 Prime minister – Johan Ludvig Holstein-Ledreborg

Events
 March 31 – The Royal Danish Academy of Fine Arts is founded as a gift to King Frederick V on his 31st birthday.

Undated

Births
 7 September – Hartvig  Marcus Frisch, civil servant (died 1816)

Deaths
 28 January – Ludvig Holberg, author, playwright, academic (born 1684)
 5 February – Caroline Thielo, actress (born (1735 in Denmark|1735)
 7 June – Nicolai Eigtved, architect (born 1701)
 18 September – Ferdinand Anton Danneskiold-Laurvig, Count (b 1688)

References

 
1750s in Denmark
Denmark
Years of the 18th century in Denmark